The 4th Test and Evaluation Squadron (4 TES) is a United States Space Force unit. Assigned to Space Training and Readiness Command's Space Delta 12, it is responsible for testing and evaluating the Space Force's electromagnetic spectrum capabilities. It is headquartered at Schriever Space Force Base, Colorado.

List of commanders 
 Lt Col Benjamin Szutar, 1 June 2022
 Lt Col Ryan Caulk, 27 August 2021

See also 
 Space Delta 12

References

External links 

Military education and training in the United States
Squadrons of the United States Space Force